The Garter Girl is a 1920 American silent drama film directed by Edward H. Griffith and starring Corinne Griffith, Sally Crute and Earl Metcalfe.

Cast
 Corinne Griffith as Rosalie Ray
 Sally Crute as Lynette 
 Earl Metcalfe as Brad Mortimer
 Rod La Rocque as Arthur Lyle
 James Tarbell

References

Bibliography
 Langman, Larry. American Film Cycles: The Silent Era. Greenwood Publishing, 1998.

External links
 

1920 films
1920 drama films
1920s English-language films
American silent feature films
Silent American drama films
American black-and-white films
Films directed by Edward H. Griffith
Vitagraph Studios films
1920s American films